Danowski is a surname. Notable people with the surname include:

Ed Danowski (1911–1997), American football player
John Danowski (born 1954), American lacrosse player
Matt Danowski (born 1985), American lacrosse player

See also 
Raymond Danowski Poetry Library, is a poetry library at Emory University in Atlanta, Georgia, U.S.